Kaštelir-Labinci is a municipality in Istria, Croatia. The population is 1,334 (census 2001).

List of villages in municipality:    
 Babići - 73
 Brnobići - 123
 Cerjani - 15
 Deklići - 34
 Dvori - 37
 Kaštelir - 283
 Kovači - 55
 Krančići - 80
 Labinci - 269
 Mekiši kod Kaštelira - 20
 Rogovići - 90
 Rojci - 64
 Roškići - 53
 Tadini - 68
 Valentići - 70

References

External links
 Kaštelir-Labinci Official site

Municipalities of Croatia
Populated places in Istria County
Italian-speaking territorial units in Croatia